The 1989–90 Nationale 1A season was the 69th season of the Nationale 1A, the top level of ice hockey in France. 10 teams participated in the league, and the Dragons de Rouen won the first league title. Ours de Villard-de-Lans and Hockey Club de Caen were relegated to the Nationale 1B.

Regular season

Playoffs

External links
Season on hockeyarchives.info

France
1989–90 in French ice hockey
Ligue Magnus seasons